

Women's 50m Butterfly - Final

Women's 50m Butterfly - Semifinals

Women's 50m Butterfly - Semifinal 01

Women's 50m Butterfly - Semifinal 02

Women's 50m Butterfly - Heats

Women's 50m Butterfly - Heat 01

Women's 50m Butterfly - Heat 02

Women's 50m Butterfly - Heat 03

Women's 50m Butterfly - Heat 04

Women's 50m Butterfly - Heat 05

50 metres butterfly
Women's 50 metre butterfly
Commonwealth Games 50 metre butterfly